João Miguel Cândido Duarte (born 21 May 1993) is a Portuguese footballer who plays as a defender.

External links

1993 births
Living people
People from Portimão
Portuguese footballers
Association football defenders
Liga Portugal 2 players
Segunda Divisão players
Portimonense S.C. players
Sportspeople from Faro District